Severine Goulois  (born 18 April 1982) is a French footballer who played as a defender for the France women's national football team. She was part of the team at the 2003 FIFA Women's World Cup.

References

External links
 
 

1982 births
Living people
French women's footballers
France women's international footballers
Place of birth missing (living people)
2003 FIFA Women's World Cup players
Women's association football defenders
People from Béthune
Sportspeople from Pas-de-Calais
Footballers from Hauts-de-France
FCF Hénin-Beaumont players